The Division of McEwen is an Australian Electoral Division in the state of Victoria. Classed as a rural seat, the electorate is located in the centre of the state, north of its capital city Melbourne. It includes the outer northern suburbs of Doreen, Mernda, and Wollert, and extends along the Hume Freeway north of the metropolitan area to include the towns of  Gisborne as well as Wallan as well as many other small towns.

Geography
Since 1984, federal electoral division boundaries in Australia have been determined at redistributions by a redistribution committee appointed by the Australian Electoral Commission. Redistributions occur for the boundaries of divisions in a particular state, and they occur every seven years, or sooner if a state's representation entitlement changes or when divisions of a state are malapportioned.

History

The Division was proclaimed at the redistribution of 14 September 1984, and was first contested at the 1984 federal election. It was named after Sir John McEwen, leader of the Australian Country Party from 1958 to 1971, who served as caretaker Prime Minister of Australia after the disappearance of Harold Holt in 1967.

While classed as rural, it is actually a hybrid urban-rural seat. The urban portion is located in Labor's traditional heartland of north Melbourne, while the rural portion votes equally strongly for the Liberals and Nationals. As a result, for most of its existence it has been highly marginal. Unlike most marginal seats with similar demographics, however, McEwen is not considered a barometer for winning government. All but one of its members has spent at least one term in opposition.

The 2007 election resulted in McEwen becoming the most marginal seat in the country. Incumbent Liberal MP Fran Bailey led throughout most of the initial count, and was initially found to have lost to former Labor state MLC Rob Mitchell by six votes. Bailey subsequently requested and was granted a full recount, which overturned Mitchell's win and instead gave Bailey a twelve-vote victory. The result was challenged in the High Court of Australia in its capacity as the Court of Disputed Returns, and was referred to the Federal Court of Australia. Over seven months after the election and a review of 643 individual votes, the court altered the formal status of several dozen, eventually declaring Bailey the winner by 27 votes, later amended to 31 votes. Following the resolution of the long-running dispute, Bailey called for a total overhaul of the voting system.

Bailey retired at the 2010 election where Mitchell again stood as the Labor candidate and won amid a considerable swing to Labor in Victoria that allowed Julia Gillard to form a minority government. Ahead of the 2013 election, a redistribution pushed McEwen further into Melbourne, increasing Labor's notional majority from a marginal 5.3 percent to a fairly safe 9.2 percent. However, Mitchell barely retained the seat against former Liberal MLC Donna Petrovich with a majority of just 0.15 percent—a margin of just 313 votes—which made McEwen the second most marginal seat in Australia at the time; the Division of Fairfax, won by Clive Palmer, was decided by a thinner margin of just 53 votes.  Mitchell won a third term in 2016 Australian federal election on a swing of over seven percent, boosting his majority to 57 percent, the strongest result in the seat's history.

Members

Election results

References

External links
 Division of McEwen - Australian Electoral Commission

Electoral divisions of Australia
Constituencies established in 1984
1984 establishments in Australia
Shire of Nillumbik
Shire of Mitchell
Shire of Macedon Ranges
City of Whittlesea